is a Japanese football player. He plays for Matsumoto Yamaga.

Career
Ryo Toyama joined J2 League club Mito HollyHock in 2017.

Club statistics
Updated to end of 2020 season.

References

External links
Profile at Mito HollyHock
Profile at Akita

1994 births
Living people
Hannan University alumni
People from Kiyose, Tokyo
Association football people from Tokyo Metropolis
Japanese footballers
J2 League players
Mito HollyHock players
Blaublitz Akita players
Association football midfielders